The Volunteer Force was a citizen army of part-time rifle, artillery and engineer corps, created as a popular movement throughout the British Empire in 1859. Originally highly autonomous, the units of volunteers became increasingly integrated with the British Army after the Childers Reforms in 1881, before forming part of the Territorial Force in 1908. Most of the regiments of the present Army Reserves  Infantry, Artillery, Engineers and Signals units are directly descended from Volunteer Force units.

The British Army following the Crimea
Prior to the Crimean War, the British military (i.e., land forces) was made up of multiple separate forces, with a basic division into the Regular Forces (including the British Army, composed primarily of cavalry and infantry, and the Ordnance Military Corps of the Board of Ordnance, made up of the Royal Artillery, Royal Engineers, and the Royal Sappers and Miners though not including the originally civilian Commissariat Department, stores and supply departments, all of which, with barracks and other departments, were absorbed into the British Army when the Board of Ordnance was abolished in 1855). and the Reserve Forces. After the 1855 consolidation of the Regular Forces (ignoring minor forces such as the Yeomen Warders and the Yeomen of the Guard) into the Regular Force (i.e., the British Army), there still remained a number of British military (not to be confused with naval) forces that were not part of the British Army; specifically the part-time Reserve Forces, which had at various times included the Honourable Artillery Company, Militia Force (also referred to as the Constitutional Force, and originally an infantry force),<ref>MILITIA BILL. (Hansard, 23 April 1852) MILITIA BILL. House of Commons Debate 23 April 1852. Volume 120 cc1035-109. British Parliament website]</ref> the Yeomanry Force (made up of mounted units, organised similarly to the Volunteer Force), Volunteer Force, and Fencibles. Equivalents were also raised in the Crown Dependencies and many colonies.  Known collectively as the Reserve Forces, most of these had been allowed to lapse after the Napoleonic Wars, although the Yeomanry was maintained to potentially support the civil authorities against civil unrest, as at the 1819 Peterloo massacre, the Militia remained as a paper tiger, and rifle clubs were encouraged as the backbone against which the Volunteer force might be re-raised. The Militia and Volunteer Force were both re-organised in the 1850s. These forces were originally local-service, embodied during wartime or emergency, and placed under the control of Lords-Lieutenant of counties, and, in British colonies, under the colonial governors. After the British Army's Regular Reserve was created in 1859, by Secretary of State for War Sidney Herbert, and re-organised under the Reserve Force Act, 1867, the Reserve forces, to avoid confusion, were generally known as the Auxiliary Forces or Local Forces. The Regulation of the Forces Act 1871 removed the Lord-Lieutenant as head of the county reserve forces and they were increasingly integrated with the British Army.

A large number of Volunteer Corps were formed during the French Revolutionary War but were stood down afterwards. Following the Crimean War, it was painfully clear to the War Office that, with half of the British Army dispositioned around the Empire on garrison duty, it had insufficient forces available to quickly compose and despatch an effective expeditionary force to a new area of conflict, unless it was to reduce the British Isles' own defences. During the Crimean War, the War Office had been forced to send militia and yeomanry to make up the shortfall of soldiers in the Regular Army. The situation had been complicated by the fact that both auxiliary forces were under the control of the Home Office until 1855.

Tensions rose between the United Kingdom and France following the Orsini affair, an assassination attempt on Emperor Napoleon III on 14 January 1858. It emerged that the would-be assassin, Felice Orsini had travelled to England to have the bombs used in the attack manufactured in Birmingham. The perceived threat of invasion by the much larger French Army was such that, even without sending a third of the army to another Crimea, Britain's military defences had already been stretched invitingly thin. On 29 April 1859 war broke out between France and the Austrian Empire (the Second Italian War of Independence), and there were fears that Britain might be caught up in a wider European conflict.

Creation of the Volunteer Force
On 12 May 1859, the Secretary of State for War, Jonathan Peel issued a circular letter to lieutenants of counties in England, Wales and Scotland, authorising the formation of volunteer rifle corps (VRC, a.k.a. corps of rifle volunteers and rifle volunteer corps), and of artillery corps in defended coastal towns. Volunteer corps were to be raised under the provisions of the Volunteer Act 1804 (44 Geo.3 c.54), which had been used to form local defence forces during the Napoleonic Wars. Alfred Tennyson captured the spirit of the time by publishing his poem Riflemen Form in The Times on 9 May 1859. As a basis for the units, many communities had rifle clubs for the enjoyment of the sport of shooting.
 Corps were only to be formed on the recommendation of the county's lord-lieutenant.
 Officers were to hold their commissions from the lord-lieutenant
 Members of the corps were to swear an oath of allegiance before a justice of the peace, deputy lieutenant or commissioned officer of the corps.
 The force was liable to be called out "in case of actual invasion, or of appearance of an enemy in force on the coast, or in case of rebellion arising in either of these emergencies.”
 While under arms volunteers were subject to military law and were entitled to be billeted and to receive regular army pay.
 Members were not permitted to quit the force during actual military service, and at other times had to give fourteen days notice before being permitted to leave the corps.
 Members were to be returned as "effective" if they had attended eight days drill and exercise in four months, or 24 days within a year.
 The members of the corps were to provide their own arms and equipment, and were to defray all costs except when assembled for actual service.
 Volunteers were also permitted to choose the design of their uniforms, subject to the lord-lieutenant's approval.
 Although volunteers were to pay for their own firearms, they were to be provided under the superintendence of the War Office, so as to ensure uniformity of gauge.
 The number of officers and private men in each county and corps was to be settled by the War Office, based on the lord-lieutenant's recommendation.

Originally corps were to consist of approximately 100 all ranks under the command of a captain, with some localities having subdivisions of thirty men under a lieutenant. The purpose of the rifle corps was to harass the invading enemy's flanks, while artillery corps were to man coastal guns and forts. Although not mentioned in the circular letter, engineer corps were also formed, principally to place underwater mines for port defence. Stretcher-bearers attached to the rifle corps subsequently formed volunteer medical detachments affiliated to the Army Medical Corps. In a handful of counties, units of light horse or mounted rifles were formed.

Two volunteer units whose services had been accepted by Queen Victoria during the early 1850s became the two senior rifle corps of the new force. These were the Exeter and South Devon Volunteers, formed in 1852, who became the 1st Devonshire Rifle Volunteers (and were often referred to as the 1st Rifle Volunteer Corps), and the Victoria Rifles (descended from the Duke of Cumberland's Sharpshooters, formed in 1803) who became the 1st Middlesex Rifle Volunteers. An order of precedence was established for ninety-two other counties, depending upon the date of establishment of the first corps in the county.

The most senior artillery corps was the 1st Northumberland formed at Tynemouth on 2 August 1859.

Initially, there were attempts at class distinction with the middle class seeing the formation of rifle units as a contrast with the strict class divide between the officers of the gentry and the other ranks of the working class and farm labourers of the militia and the standing army. Some also compared the initiative, small unit tactics and marksmanship principles of rifle regiments of the Napoleonic Wars compared with the linear tactics of the standing army.  Many units initially favoured green and grey (colours until then used by British and German rifle units in the army) rifleman uniforms as opposed to the red coats of the infantry and engineers of the army and militia. In turn, the army was glad not to have amateur volunteers wear the scarlet of the regulars. The provisions of the volunteers having to purchase their own rifles and uniforms was felt by some to exclude the lower classes.

Unlike regular rifle regiments, the volunteer units had colours often made and presented by the women of the community. These were unauthorised, however, with the Volunteer Regulations stating "Neither Standards nor Colours are to be carried by Corps on parade, as the Volunteer Force is composed of Arms to which their use is not appropriate".

Consolidation
The large number of small independent corps proved difficult to administer, and, by 1861, most had been formed into battalion-sized units, either by "consolidation": increasing an existing corps to battalion size (usually in large urban areas), or by forming administrative battalions or brigades by the grouping of smaller corps (in rural areas). An official book of drill and rifle instructions for the Corps of Rifle Volunteers and volunteer regulations were published in 1859 and 1861 respectively.

Cadet Corps

From 1860 Cadet Corps were also formed, consisting of school-age boys, which were the forerunners of the Army Cadet Force and Combined Cadet Force. Like the adult volunteers, the boys were supplied with arms by the War Office, for which they had to pay a fee, which reduced the longer they remained members. Cadet Corps were usually associated with private schools. They paraded regularly in public.

Royal Commission of 1862
In 1862, a royal commission chaired by Viscount Eversley was appointed "to inquire into the condition of the volunteer force in Great Britain and into the probability of its continuance at its existing strength".

According to the report, as of 1 April 1862, the Volunteer Force had a strength of 162,681 consisting of:
 662 light horse
 24,363 artillery
 2,904 engineers
 656 mounted rifles
 134,096 rifle volunteers, of whom 48,796 were in 86 consolidated battalions and 75,535 in 134 administrative battalions

Their report made a number of recommendations and observations on funding and training:
 The costs of setting up the volunteer corps had largely been met by public subscription and assistance from honorary members. However the uniforms and equipment were reaching the end of their lives, and the cost of replacement would have to be met by the volunteers themselves, which was likely to lead to many members leaving the force.
 In order to rectify this problem the commission proposed a government grant of 20 shillings per man (30 shillings in the case of artillery), but only on production of a certificate that he had satisfactorily attended a prescribed number of drills in the previous twelve months, had gone through a course of musketry or gunnery instruction, and was present at the annual inspection by a general officer. Grants were not to be made where, on inspection, the volunteer was clearly inefficient, or where his rifle had not been properly maintained.
 Corps that received the grant were to be entitled to spend it on headquarters, drill grounds and halls, transport, maintenance of arms, uniforms and accoutrements. Where the money was to be spent on uniforms, the material used was to be of sealed pattern, and the lord-lieutenant could compel all units of the same arm within the county to adopt a common uniform.
 The commission found that many of the drill instructors employed by the volunteer corps were of poor quality, and recommended the establishment of school of drill instructors. They also suggested that wherever possible volunteers should be united with troops of the line for exercise and instruction 

Volunteer Act 1863
To carry into effect the recommendations of the commission, and to replace the 1804 legislation, the Volunteer Act 1863 (26 & 27 Vict. C.65) was passed.

Part I of the Act dealt with the organisation of the Volunteer Force. It became lawful for "Her Majesty to accept the services of persons desiring to be formed under the Act into a Volunteer Corps, and offering their services to Her Majesty through the Lieutenant of a County". On acceptance, the corps would be deemed lawfully formed. Existing corps were to continue under the new Act, although the power was given to the Crown to disband any corps. The constitution of a permanent staff consisting of an adjutant and serjeant instructors was permitted for each corps. The grouping of two or more corps into administrative regiments was recognised, and a permanent staff could be provided for the grouping. However the individual corps were to continue to exist. As in the earlier legislation, a volunteer could resign with fourteen days notice, with the addition that if a commanding officer refused to remove a volunteer from the roll of the corps, then he could appeal to two justices of the peace of the county. An annual inspection by an officer of the regular army was instituted, and efficiency standards were to be set by Order in Council, as were regulations for governing the Force. The lord-lieutenant of a county, or the commanding officer of a corps or administrative regiment was empowered to appoint a court of inquiry into any corps, officer, non-commissioned officer or volunteer.

Part II of the Act dealt with "Actual Military Service". The terms for calling out of the force were altered: this would now happen in “the case of actual or apprehended invasion of any part of the United Kingdom (the occasion being first communicated to both Houses of Parliament if parliament is sitting, or declared in council and notified by proclamation if parliament is not sitting.)” As well as being entitled to pay and billets, relief was also to be given to the wives and families of volunteers. A bounty of one guinea was to be paid to volunteers on release from actual military service, such release being notified in order by writing by the lord-lieutenant. If disabled on service, officers and volunteers were to receive a pension.

Part III dealt with discipline and part IV with the rules and property of the corps.

Part V dealt with the process of acquiring land for shooting ranges. Apart from the corps taking ownership of the land, a municipal corporation or private company could grant a licence to the volunteers to use their land for the purpose. Justices of the peace were given the power to close rights of way adjacent to ranges.

The Act concluded by defining the counties to which the corps were to belong: for the purposes of the Act the Isle of Wight, the Tower Hamlets and the Cinque Ports were separate counties, with the Governor of the Isle of Wight, the Constable of the Tower of London and the Lord Warden of the Cinque Ports commissioning officers in place of the lord-lieutenant. The Isle of Man was also to dealt with as if it were a county of England, with the Lieutenant-Governor performing the same role as a county lord-lieutenant.

Integration
In 1872, under the provisions of the Regulation of the Forces Act 1871, jurisdiction over the volunteers was removed from the county lord-lieutenants and placed under the Secretary of State for War. Volunteer units became increasingly integrated with the Regular Army. This culminated in the Childers Reforms of 1881 which nominated rifle volunteer corps as volunteer battalions of the new "county" infantry regiments, which also consisted of regular and militia battalions within a defined regimental district. Over the next few years many of the rifle volunteer corps adopted the "volunteer battalion" designation and the uniform of their parent regiment. This was far from universal, however, with some corps retaining their original names and distinctive dress until 1908.

The artillery volunteers were similarly remodelled as reserve formations of the Royal Artillery, eventually being redesignated as Royal Garrison Artillery (Volunteers) in 1902, while the Engineer Volunteers became Royal Engineers (Volunteers).

Second Boer War
The volunteers finally saw active service during the Second Boer War, when the prolonged campaign necessitated an increase in the size of British forces in South Africa. Volunteer Battalions formed Volunteer Active Service Companies that joined the regular battalions of their county regiments. Following the war, the battle honour "South Africa 1900–02" was awarded to the volunteer units that provided detachments for the campaign.

The Territorial Force
By 1907, when its civilian administration teetered on the brink of insolvency, the Volunteer Force had become indispensable to British defence planning, as well as an enabler of the Regular Army's drawing its own forces away from home defence stations. Consequently, the government passed the Territorial and Reserve Forces Act 1907, which merged the Volunteer Force with the Yeomanry to form the Territorial Force in 1908 (while the Militia was re-organised as the Special Reserve, which provided a body of trained men available for drafting to regular battalions as required during wartime).  The total cost of the TF was to be met in future by central government. In addition to the introduction of terms of service for volunteers, most of the units lost their unique identities, becoming numbered territorial battalions of the local army regiment, albeit with distinctive badges or dress distinctions.

The 1907 act did not extend to the Isle of Man, and consequently the 7th (Isle of Man) Volunteer Battalion of The King's (Liverpool Regiment) continued to serve as the only remaining unit of the Volunteer Force until disbandment in 1922. (1868 -1922)

Strength
According to the Territorial Year Book 1909, the Volunteer Force had the following strength over its existence:

See also

 :Category:Units and formations of the Volunteer Force (Great Britain)
 :Category:Rifle Volunteer Corps of the British Army
 :Category:Artillery Volunteer Corps of the British Army
 :Category:Engineer Volunteer Corps of the British Army
 :Category:Mounted Rifle Volunteers of the British Army
 :Category:Volunteer Infantry Brigades of the British Army
 :Category:Volunteer Force officers
 British Volunteer Corps – 1794–1803 1st Middlesex Volunteers
 Army Reserve (United Kingdom)
 Militia (United Kingdom)
 Volunteer Training Corps (World War I)
 Home Service Force
 Honourable Artillery Company
 Post Office Rifles
 1st Nottinghamshire (Robin Hood) Volunteer Rifle Corps (VRC)
 Artists' Rifles
 The Liverpool Scottish
 Halifax Volunteer Battalion, Nova Scotia
 Victoria Rifles (Nova Scotia)
 The Royal Hong Kong Regiment (The Volunteers)
 Cambridgeshire Regiment

References

Bibliography
 Beckett, I F W, 2007.  Riflemen Form:  A Study of the Rifle Volunteer Movement, 1859–1908, Pen & Sword.  
 Grierson, James Moncrieff, Lt Gen Gen, 1909.  Records of the Scottish Volunteer Force'', William Blackwood and Sons.

External links
 Research Press: The Volunteer Force 1859-1908. Rifle Corps Histories.
 History, esp Inspector-General of Auxiliary Forces
 Giles Hudson, “Shots of Shots: Photographs of the Oxford Volunteer Rifle Corps”, Matters Photographical

 
History of the British Army
1859 establishments in the United Kingdom
Military units and formations established in 1859
Volunteer military units and formations